The Curtiss 18T, unofficially known as the Wasp and by the United States Navy as the Kirkham, was an early American triplane fighter aircraft designed by Curtiss for the US Navy.

Design and development
The Curtiss 18T was intended to protect bombing aircraft over France, and a primary requisite for this job was speed. The streamlined and very "clean" fuselage contributed to the aircraft's performance. The basic construction was based on cross-laminated strips of wood veneer formed on a mold and attached to the inner structure. The technique was a refinement of that used on the big Curtiss flying boats.

Operational history

The Model 18T-2 was an improved version of its predecessor, with 50 additional horsepower. The wings of the new model were swept back. It was also  longer with a  larger two-bay wing, though its operational ceiling was  lower.

After World War I, it was employed as a racing plane: an 18T-2 nearly won the Curtiss Marine Trophy Race in 1922 (limited to U.S. Navy pilots), but the pilot, Lt. Sanderson ran out of fuel just before the finish line.

Curtiss Engineering followed the Model 18T with the Model 18B, unofficially known as the "Hornet", built to otherwise similar specifications.

Variants

Model 18T or 18T-1 Two-seat fighter triplane with single-bay wings, powered by a  Curtiss K-12 piston engine. Referred to by the US Navy as the "Kirkham". Originally designated 18T, the type was redesignated the 18T-1 when the prototype was modified to a new configuration designated 18T-2 (see below).
Model 18T-2 18T with longer-span two-bay wings. Could be fitted with floatplane or landplane landing gear.
Model 18B Biplane fighter version, known unofficially as the  "Hornet". Sole flying prototype of Curtiss 18B, USAAS 40058, 'P-86', crashed early in flight trials at McCook Field, Dayton, Ohio, summer 1919. Type not ordered into production. One non-flying prototype also delivered for static testing.

Operators

United States Navy

Specifications (18T-1 Wasp)

Notes

Bibliography
 Angelucci, Enzo and Peter Bowers. The American Fighter: The Definitive Guide to American Fighter Aircraft from 1917 to the Present. New York: Orion Books, 1985. .
 Bowers, Peter M. Curtiss Aircraft 1907–1947. London: Putnam, 1979. .
 "The Curtiss Model 18-T Triplane." Flight, Volume XI, Issue 22, No. 544, 29 May 1919, pp. 698–700.
 "The Curtiss Model 18-B Biplane." Volume XI, Issue 28, No. 550, 10 July 1919, pp. 902–904.
 Green, William and Gordon Swanborough. The Complete Book of Fighters. New York: Salamander, 1994. .

External links

 No. 8901. Curtiss 18-T-2 Wasp (A-3325) US Navy

1910s United States fighter aircraft
18
Triplanes
Single-engined tractor aircraft
Aircraft first flown in 1918